USS LST-957 was an  in the United States Navy. Like many of her class, she was not named and is properly referred to by her hull designation.

Construction
LST-957 was laid down on 30 September 1944, at Hingham, Massachusetts, by the Bethlehem-Hingham Shipyard; launched on 30 October 1944; and commissioned on 20 November 1944.

Service history
During World War II, LST-957 was assigned to the Asiatic-Pacific theater and participated in the assault and occupation of Okinawa Gunto in April and May 1945.

Following the war, she performed occupation duty in the Far East until early October 1945. The ship was decommissioned on 20 May 1946, and sold to Bosey, Philippines, on 5 December 1947. She was struck from the Navy list on 22 January 1948.

Awards
LST-957 earned one battle star for World War II service.

Notes

Citations

Bibliography 

Online resources

External links
 

LST-542-class tank landing ships
World War II amphibious warfare vessels of the United States
Ships built in Hingham, Massachusetts
1944 ships